The Pretty Reckless is the self-titled debut EP by American rock band The Pretty Reckless. The album was released on June 22, 2010, by Interscope Records. The album's lead single, "Make Me Wanna Die", was released on May 13, 2010.

Singles
On December 30, 2009, the first single entitled "Make Me Wanna Die" was released as a special preview for the Seventeen magazine. The song was officially released on May 13, 2010 in UK and peaked at 1# on the UK Rock Chart and was received with positive reviews. The track also appeared on the Kick-Ass soundtrack.

The promotional video was released on May 13, 2010 and was followed by the official version released on September 15, 2010.

Critical reception
 
Even though it was received with enthusiasm by the fans, Christian Hoard of Rolling Stone classified the music as "generic".

Track listing

References

2010 debut EPs
Interscope Records EPs
The Pretty Reckless albums